Anatol Teslev is a Moldovan association football head coach and former player.

Player career
He won UEFA European Under-18 Football Championship for USSR in 1966 (now U-19 event). Former clubs include Moldova Chişinău, FC Dynamo Vologda, Speranta Drochia.

Coaching career
He coached Nistru, FC Start Ulyanovsk, FC Tighina Bender, FC Nistru Otaci and the Moldovan youth team.

He was the coach of the national side between February to December 2006.

He was replaced by his assistant Igor Dobrovolski.

Management career
He was the vice-president and general secretary of the Football Association of Moldova and in the management board of FC Zimbru Chișinău and FC Constructorul Chisinau.

In 2005, he became the president of the nation FA, beaten Pavel Cebanu in election.

External links

1947 births
Living people
Soviet footballers
Moldovan football managers
FC Zimbru Chișinău players
Moldova national football team managers
FC Chornomorets Odesa players
Place of birth missing (living people)
Association football midfielders
FC Dynamo Vologda players